Orgasmic Nightmare is the fourth full-length album released by the Welsh psychobilly band Demented Are Go.

Track listing
"Orgasmic Nightmare"
"Beast in the Cellar"
"House of Blood"
"Now She's Dead"
"Clitoris Bite Boogie"
"Love Is Like Electrocution" 
"Who Put Grandma Under the Stairs?" 
"Love Seeps Like a Festering Sore" 
"Nightlife"
"Anal Wonderland" 
"Demon Angel"
"Straight Jacket"
"Rubber Rock"
"One Sharp Knife" 
"Cast Iron Arm" (Live) * 
"Marijuana" (Live) * 
"Satan's Reject" (Live) *

'*' bonus tracks on CD

Personnel
 Mark 'Sparky' Phillips - vocals
 Antanoid ´Horseman´ Thomas - drums 
 Lex ´Luther Boy Wonder´ - Guitar
 Billy ´Space Cadet´ Munster - Slap bass

Production
 Producer: 
 Engineers: 
 Mastering: 
 CD Mastering: jfj
 Photography:

Demented Are Go albums
1986 albums